Cymbospondylus (a Greek word meaning "boat vertebrae") was a basal early ichthyosaur that lived between the early and middle Triassic period (249-237 million years ago). Previously, the genus was classified as a shastasaurid, but more recent work finds it to be more basal. Cymbospondylus was a cosmopolitan genus found in Nevada, Europe (Switzerland, Germanic Basin) and Spitsbergen.

History

Cymbospondylus was described from Nevada by Joseph Leidy in 1868 on the basis of several fragmentary vertebrae which he assigned to two different species: C. piscosus (the type species) and C. petrinus. The University of California, under the direction of John Campbell Merriam and funded by Annie Alexander, conducted extensive fieldwork in the region in the late nineteenth and early twentieth century, following the description of Cymbospondylus, recovering additional fossil material of C. petrinus in particular. The fragmentary nature of the type species however presented itself to be a problem later, as research published in the early 2000s indicated that the remains that form C. piscosus are not diagnostic. Although it has been suggested that a nearly complete specimen of C. petrinus should serve as a neotype in order to preserve the already well-established name, no formal appeal has been made as of yet.

Fossils discovered in Switzerland were described as Cymbospondylus buchseri based on an almost complete anterior skeleton including the skull, pectoral girdle and flippers as well as an uninterrupted series of 51 presacral vertebrae with associated ribs by P. Martin Sander.
Cymbospondylus nichollsi (after curator Dr Elizabeth L. Nicholls) was named by Fröbisch and colleagues in 2006 and Cymbospondylus duelferi (after preparator Olaf Dülfer) was named in 2020 by Nicole Klein and colleagues.
In 2021, a new species designated C. youngorum was described by P. Martin Sander and colleagues based on remains discovered in 1998 and excavated in 2014 and 2015. The specific name "youngorum" was chosen to honor Tom and Bonda Young of Great Basin Brewery, Nevada, for supporting the project financially.

As a historic genus dating to the late 19th century, many species have been assigned to Cymbospondylus only to be declared synonymous with already existing species or altogether undiagnostic. These include C. germanicus, C. parvus, C. nevadanus and C. grandis (originally Chonespondylus). Cymbospondylus natans, originally named by Merriam in 1908, was eventually recovered as a member of Mixosaurus and then synonymized with Phalarodon nordenskioeldii. In a similar fashion, remains from China had been named Cymbospondylus asiaticus in 2002, but were later assigned to the shastasaurid Guizhouichthyosaurus tangae.

Description
Cymbospondylus was a medium to large sized animal, some species of the genus reaching enormous proportions. Unlike later groups of ichthyosaurs, Cymbospondylus had an elongated, more cylindrical body. The skull of Cymbospondylus is overall wedge-shaped and tapering evenly towards the tip of the snout. Most of the rostrum is made from the premaxilla and nasal bones, as typical in ichthyosaurs. The robustness varies between the species, with C. youngorum having the most massive. The eyes in Cymbospondylus are relatively small for an ichthyosaur and appear to not have grown in relation to the body size increase observed in the genus. Most species in the genus, with the exception of C. youngorum and C. nichollsi, have a very pronounced sagittal crest. The dentition differs between the species, with C. duelferi possessing less than 21 teeth per each side of the jaw, C. petrinus 30 - 35. C. youngorum possesses the most teeth with over 40 per ramus. However, the teeth of C. youngorum are much smaller and lack the cutting edges of the teeth seen in Thalattoarchon, a similarly sized ichthyosaur from the same region and exact horizon. The caudal fluke of Cymbospondylus was positioned at a relatively shallow angle, unlike the lunate caudal fin typical for the derived ichthyosaurs of the Jurassic and Cretaceous such as Ophthalmosaurus. It is currently unknown of Cymbospondylus had a dorsal fin similar to those seen in more derived taxa. The earliest occurrence of a dorsal fin has been observed in Mixosaurus, commonly recovered as more derived than Cymbospondylus.

Size

Evolution
Of particular interest is the rapid increase in body size undergone by ichthyosaurs early in their evolutionary history. Ichthyosaurs evolved from small (skull length 55 mm) ancestors such as Cartorhynchus to giant forms like C. youngorum in the span of only 2.5 million years. Cetaceans meanwhile, which originated under similar conditions (following the mass extinction at the end of the Cretaceous period eradicating much of marine tetrapod diversity) took notably longer to obtain similar sizes. Between Pakicetus (skull width 127 mm) and Basilosaurus isis (skull width 600 mm) a total of 10 to 14 million years passed, almost five times as much as between Cartorhynchus and Cymbospondylus youngorum. In toothed whales, the size increase likewise took notably longer with around 25 million years passing between the basal Simocetus and the massive Livyatan. In their 2021 study Sander, Griebeler, Schmiz and their colleagues determined that ichthyosaurs underwent rapid size increase early on in their evolutionary history, in particular among Cymbospondylus and early merriamosaurs, while whales obtained great sizes relatively slowly. Even when restricting the analysis to only observe the growth in members of Pelagiceti (fully aquatic whales) to account for the varying degrees of aquatic adaptations, cetaceans still reached large body sizes much slower than ichthyosaurs. Meanwhile, after this initial burst the overall size of ichthyosaurs slowed down significantly, while among crown group whales body sizes increased initially slowly before accelerating rapidly later in their history. Sander et al. (2021) suggests that this rapid increase in body size may have been favored by the swift recovery of conodonts and ammonites following the Permian–Triassic extinction event. They further suggests that the evolution of large eyes, a trait present in many ichthyosaurs, further assisted them in exploiting this food source efficiently.

Classification

The exact placement of Cymbospondylus within Ichthyosauria is poorly understood with its position varying between different studies, sometimes being recovered as more and sometimes as less derived than mixosaurids. However it is agreed upon that Cymbospondylus is a rather basal member of the clade. Early phylogenies placed Cymbospondylus within Shastasauridae. In the analysis of Bindellini et al. (2021), Cymbospondylus is placed at the very base of Ichthyosauria, outside the more derived members of Hueneosauria (including Mixosauridae and Shastasauridae). In the publication describing C. duelferi, Klein and colleagues recovered that all species from the Fossil Hill Member in Nevada form a clade with one another. The description of C. youngorum further supports this Nevadan clade, recovering C. youngorum as its most derived member while C. buchseri from Europe sits at the base of the genus. Much like in the analysis by Bindellini and colleagues, shastasaurids and mixosaurids were recovered as more derived ichthyosaurs. 

Like in many analyses prior, the type species was not included in the dataset due to its questionable and fragmentary nature.  This causes Cymbospondylus to have a very convoluted taxonomy, with it being suggested that the type species should be neglected. The 2020 study reviewed the skull morphology of C. nichollsi and found the species to be valid, as the skull morphology accords with that of C. petrinus but is distinct enough to be separate, such as the upper temporal fenestra shape being oval in C. nichollsi but triangular in C. petrinus. In their phylogenetic analysis the authors did not recover a definite placement for C. buchseri, leading them to state that further study was needed to determine whether the Swiss species belonged to the genus.

The cladogram below is from the 2021 study which named C. youngorum:

Palaeobiology

Paleoecology
Massare & Callaway (1990) propose that many Triassic ichthyosaurs including Cymbospondylus may have been ambush predators. They argue that the long neck and torso would create drag in water while the laterally-flattened tail lacking the lunate fluke of later ichthyosaur taxa was more suited for an undulating swimming style. In their research they suggest that the elongated flexible bodies of early ichthyosaurs were built to support an undulating swimming style while the powerful tail would provide bursts of speed, both of which they cite as being possible adaptations to ambush prey. Massare & Callaway put this in contrast with Jurassic taxa, known for their compact, dolphin-like bodies adapted for more continuous swimming favorable to pursuit predators. A strikingly similar bauplan was later obtained by two other large bodied marine amniote groups, mosasaurs and archaeocete whales.

Direct evidence for its diet exists for the medium-sized Cymbospondylus buchseri from Switzerland, which was found with its stomach contents exclusively consisting of hooks belonging to soft-bodied coleoid cephalopods. However, this does not exclude the possibility that C. buchseri could have taken larger prey, as its last meal may not reflect its typical diet accurately. Bindellini and colleagues suggest that C. buchseri may have employed a more forceful feeding strategy with a slower feeding cycle and a higher biteforce, supported by the animal's robust rostrum. In the Besano Formation, Cymbospondylus would have coexisted with two other smaller ichthyosaurs, the more gracile skulled Besanosaurus and small mixosaurs. Whether or not C. buchseri would have gone after large vertebrate prey, all three taxa display clear adaptations for different hunting strategies and prey preferences, however the details of their ecologies are not yet fully understood.

For C. youngorum a generalist diet of squid and fish is inferred based on the blunt and conical teeth in combination with the elongated rostrum. However, as with C. buchseri, Sander et al. entertain the possibility that C. youngorum could have fed on large-bodied vertebrates as well, including the other Cymbospondylus species of the region.

Cymbospondylus was especially diverse in the Fossil Hill Member of the Favret and Prida formations of Nevada, which preserves a pelagic environment from the middle to late Anisian (ca. 246 - 242 million years ago). The Fossil Hill Member specifically preserves some of the greatest ichthyosaur diversity recorded, with eight distinct taxa present. This includes four species of Cymbospondylus, the early macropredatory Thalattoarchon, the small Phalarodon fraasi and P. callawayi as well as the poorly understood Omphalosaurus. Other animals present in the environment include a single sauropterygian, Augustasaurus hagdorni, halobiid bivalves but only few remains of fish. However this may be due to preservation bias. Despite this abundance of amniote fossils, analysis of the preserved ecosystem indicates that the Fossil Hill Member represents a stable food web largely dominated by said amniotes, occupying niches held by fish in modern marine ecosystems. Furthermore, the analysis conducted by Eva Maria Griebeler in the study of Sander and colleagues indicates the presence of an energy surplus, which may indicate the presence of an as of yet unknown animal in the Fossil Hill fauna or that this energy surplus may have been exploited by animals that evolved later. The ecosystem could have supported another giant marine reptile, assuming it were be a bulk feeder specialised on small prey that's lower in the food chain. Such an animal could have for example been a filter feeder, a niche not yet occupied by any animal in the fauna of the Fossil Hill Member.

Bindellini and colleagues notes that shastasaurid diversity may have profited from the extinction of Cymbospondylus, such as the Carnian of China, known to have supported three ecologically different shastasaurids but no examples of cymbospondylids, which had gone extinct by that time.

Reproduction
The holotype of C. duelferi preserves three small strings of articulated vertebrae located within the trunk region of the specimen. These vertebrae, which are only a third the size of the adult specimen, have been interpreted to represent the remains of three fetuses, with one specimen specifically facing towards the rear end of the putative mother. Following this interpretation, Cymbospondylus would have given live birth to a minimum of three offspring.

See also
 List of ichthyosaurs
 Timeline of ichthyosaur research

References

Middle Triassic ichthyosaurs
Early Triassic ichthyosaurs
Middle Triassic reptiles of Europe
Middle Triassic reptiles of North America
Early Triassic reptiles of Europe
Ichthyosauromorph genera